Tomas van Houtryve is a Belgian visual artist, director and cinematographer working mainly with photography and video. He is an Emeritus member of the VII Photo Agency, and a Contributing Artist for Harper's Magazine.

Life and career
Van Houtryve attended a university in Nepal, studying philosophy. He became internationally known for his photographs of the Maoist rebellion in Nepal, winning the Visa pour l'Image Ville de Perpignan award in 2006 and the Bayeux Calvados-Normandy Award for war correspondents in 2006.

Van Houtryve next embarked on a seven-year photographic project to document life in the last countries where the Communist Party still remained in power: North Korea, Cuba, China, Nepal, Vietnam, and Laos. In 2010 he was named Photographer of the Year in the Pictures of the Year International Competition. A monograph of the work titled Behind the Curtains of 21st Century Communism was published in 2012.

Van Houtryve then turned his interest to the US military's use of surveillance drones with a series titled Blue Sky Days. Supported by a Getty Editorial Grant of $10,000, he used his own modified drone in the US to explore the implications of surveillance techniques used by the US both outside and within its borders. For this work, van Houtryve was awarded the 2015 International Center of Photography Infinity Award and a second prize World Press Photo award.

In 2016 van Houtryve received a grant from the Pulitzer Center to create a video installation about the European refugee crisis. The work was exhibited at Chicago's Museum of Contemporary Photography the Southeastern Center for Contemporary Art and C/O Berlin. Extracts from the project were published in a 2021 book by Steidl and by The New Yorker. In 2017, the video installation was acquired for the permanent collection of the International Center for Photography with funds provided by Marjorie and Jeffrey Rosen.

Van Houtryve was selected for the inaugural CatchLight Fellowship in 2017 and granted $30,000 for a project titled Lines and Lineage. The work explores America's collective amnesia of history, addressing the missing photographic record of the period when Mexico ruled what we now know as the American West. Van Houtryve photographed the region with glass plates and a 19th-century wooden camera. He paired portraits of direct descendants of early inhabitants of the West—mestizo, Afro-Latin, indigenous, Crypto-Jewish—with photographs of landscapes along the original border and architecture from the Mexican period. The work earned van Houtryve France's 2019 Roger Pic Award. A monograph of the work was published in 2019 by Radius Books. The book was adapted into a one-hour documentary by French television, co-directed by van Houtryve and Mathilde Damoisel. The film was first broadcast in France in 2022.  It premiered in the United States with a screening at the Taos Center for the Arts under the title Far West – The Hidden History in 2022.

In 2022, van Houtryve's aerial drone photograph of Notre-Dame de Paris was featured on the cover of National Geographic Magazine.

Public collections 
Van Houtryve's work is held in the following public collections:
Museum of Contemporary Photography, Chicago
International Center of Photography Museum, New York
The Nelson-Atkins Museum of Art, Kansas City
Espace Henri Matisse, Creil France

Books 
Behind the Curtains of 21st Century Communism. Photographs of Nepal, North Korea, Cuba, Moldova, Laos, Vietnam, and China, Éditions Intervalles, Paris 2012. . Preface by Tzvetan Todorov.
La Lutte continue: voyage dans les communismes du XXIe siècle. Paris: Éditions Intervalles, 2012. . French-language version.
Geschlossene Gesellschaften: eine fotografische Reise durch kommunistische Länder. Bern: Benteli, 2012. . German-language version.
Lines and Lineage. Radius Books, 2019.

Awards
2006: Ville de Perpignan Rémi Ochlik award, Visa pour l'image, Perpignan, for photographs of the Maoist rebellion in Nepal.
2007: Bayeux-Calvados Award for war correspondents, for photographs of the Maoist rebellion in Nepal.
2010: Third place, "Issue Reporting Picture Story - Freelance/Agency", Pictures of the Year International, for the series Moldova: The Outsiders.
2010: First place, "Photographer of the Year - Freelance/Agency", Pictures of the Year International.
2015: 2nd prize in the Contemporary Issues Stories category, World Press Photo.
2015: International Center of Photography Infinity Award for the series Blue Sky Days.
2017: Hasselblad Foundation Research and Development Award
2018: CENTER’s Producer’s Choice Award, 1st Place
2019: Leica Oskar Barnack Prize, Finalist
2019: Roger Pic Award for the series Lines and Lineage.

Solo exhibitions
Chute d'un dieu souverain, 18e Festival international de photojournalisme, Visa pour l'image, Perpignan, France, 2006.
Rébellion au Népal, Les rencontres prix Bayeux–Calvados des correspondants de guerre, Galerie le Radar, Bayeux, 2007
The fall of a god king, Artè Foto Festival, Villa Salvati, Ancona, 2008
Népal: rituels et révolution, Galerie in my room, Paris, 2009
Nepal: A 'people's war' topples the god king, Moving Walls 16. Open Society Foundations, New York, London, and Washington DC, 2010
Behind the curtains, Visa pour l'image, Perpignan, France, 2010
Behind the curtains, Third Floor Gallery, Cardiff, Britain, 2011–12
Off the radar, Festival-Photoreporter, Baie de Saint-Brieuc, Côtes-d'Armor, France, 2012
Blue Sky Days, Anastasia Photo gallery, New York City 2016
Blue Sky Days, Galerija Vartai, Vilnius, Lithuania, 2017
Lines and Lineage, galerie Baudoin Lebon, Paris, 2019
Lines and Lineage, Espace Matisse, Creil, France, 2021

Group exhibitions 
North Korean Perspectives, MoCP, Chicago, USA, 2015
North Korean Perspectives, Drents Museum, Assen, the Netherlands, 2015
Bending the Frame, Fotografisk Center, Copenhagen, Denmark, 2016
To See Without Being Seen, Kemper Museum, Saint Louis, USA, 2016
Surveillance, The Nelson-Atkins Museum of Art, Kansas City, USA, 2016
Watching You, Watching Me, Museum of Photography, Berlin, Germany, 2017
Perpetual Revolution: the Image and Social Change, ICP Museum, New York, USA, 2017
Watching You, Watching Me, BOZAR, Centre for Fine Arts, Brussels, Belgium, 2018
Stateless: Views of Global Migration, MoCP, Chicago, USA, 2019
Sanctuary: Building a House Without Walls, St. John the Divine, New York, USA, 2019
WALLS, Annenberg Center for Photography, Los Angeles, USA, 2019
FLUX, Photaumnales festival, Le Quadrilatère, Beauvais, France, 2020
SEND ME AN IMAGE, C/O Foundation, Berlin, Germany, 2021

Films 
Far West – The Hidden History, Documentary (54 minutes), co-director & cinematographer, 2021

References

External links

Living people
20th-century births
Year of birth missing (living people)
Belgian photographers
Harper's Magazine people
VII Photo Agency photographers